Karadantu is a sweet delicacy unique to the state of Karnataka, India. Karadantu means fried-edible gum in the local language, Kannada. It is made of edible gum mixed with dry fruits and has a chewy texture. The other ingredients used in its preparation are fried bengal gram flour, jaggery and seeds of marking-nut (Semecarpus anacardium) tree. Gokak is very famous for karadant. Amingad town in Bagalkot district Karnataka is also famous for the karadantu produced in its sweet shops. The tastes of the 2 varieties of kardant are almost similar but never same courtesy the ingredients used.

History
Karadantu was first invented by Vijaya Karadant in Karnataka in 1907 when jaggery was put on existing desserts.

See also
 Cuisine of Karnataka

References

Karnataka cuisine
Indian desserts